General elections were held in Alderney in November 2012 in accordance with the rules governing elections in Alderney. Five of the ten seats in the States were up for election. There were 12 candidates.

Results

See also
States of Alderney Member

References

2012
2012 elections in Europe
2012 in Guernsey
November 2012 events in Europe